Jed Johnson may refer to:

 Jed Johnson (Oklahoma politician) (1888–1963), American politician
 Jed Johnson Jr. (1939–1993), American politician, son of the above
 Jed Johnson (designer) (1948–1996), American, also director